This is a list of Spanish television related events in 1990.

Events 
 25 January: Antena 3, first private TV Channel in Spain is launched. Therefore, State-owned TVE's monopoly on broadcasting activity is over, after 33 years.
 23 February: Jordi García Candau is appointed Director General of RTVE.
 3 March: New TV cannel Telecinco  is launched with an inaugural ceremony at Lope de Vega Theatre (Madrid).
 5 May: Azúcar Moreno represents Spain at the Eurovision Song Contest 1990 held in Zagreb (Yugoslavia) with the song Bandido, ranking 5th and scoring 96 points .
 8 June: Canal+, first scrambled TV channel in Spain is launched.

Debuts

Television shows

La 1

Ending this year

La 1

Foreign series debuts in Spain

Births 
 6 March - Clara Lago, actress.
 27 March - Natalia Sánchez, actress.
 23 October - Javier de Hoyos, journalist

Deaths 
 16 January - Nacho Dogan, disc-jockey & host, 38.
 24 March - Margarita Calahorra, actress, 60.
 7 April - Modesto Blanch, actor, 90.
 1 July - Mario Cabré, host, 74.
 16 July - Tomás Blanco, actor, 79.
 23 August - Antolín García, journalist, 62.
 5 October - Félix Dafauce, actor, 93.

See also
1990 in Spain
List of Spanish films of 1990

References 

1990 in Spanish television